Andrew Jay Laster (born May 25, 1961 in Bethpage, New York) is an American jazz saxophonist.

Laster studied early in his career with Joe Dixon and Dave Burns, both in the 1970s; he lived in Seattle in the early 1980s, where he attended Cornish College of the Arts and played local gigs. He relocated to New York City later in the 1980s, and played saxophone on Lyle Lovett's albums and tours between 1989 and 1995. In the 1990s he became increasingly visible as a jazz musician, working with the groups New and Used and Orange Then Blue, as well as with Marty Ehrlich, Erik Friedlander, Phil Haynes, Mark Helias, and Bobby Previte. As a leader, he has had sidemen including Friedlander, Drew Gress, Tom Rainey, Herb Robertson, Cuong Vu, and Kenny Wolleson.

Discography
 Hippo Stomp (Sound Aspects, 1989) 
 Twirler (Sound Aspects, 1990) 
 Hydra (Sound Aspects, 1994)
 Polyogue (Songlines, 1995)
 Interpretations of Lessness (Songlines, 1997)
 Soft Shell (Knitting Factory, 2000)
 Window Silver Bright (New World, 2002)
 Riptide (Tzadik, 2011)

References

American jazz saxophonists
American male saxophonists
Musicians from New York (state)
1961 births
Living people
21st-century American saxophonists
21st-century American male musicians
American male jazz musicians
Orange Then Blue members
Ghost Train Orchestra members
Lyle Lovett and His Large Band members